Balc is a commune located in Bihor County, Crișana, Romania. It is composed of five villages: Almașu Mare (Kozmaalmás), Almașu Mic (Szóvárhegy), Balc, Ghida (Berettyódéda) and Săldăbagiu de Barcău (Szoldobágy).

Sights 
 Reformed Church in Balc, built in the 18th century (1791), historic monument
 Degenfeld-Schomburg Castle in Balc, built in the 19th century (1896), historic monument

References

Balc
Localities in Crișana